Chenoch Hendel Lieberman (29 March 1900 OS – 15 March 1976), born Chenoch Hendel Futerfas, was an Orthodox Jewish  Russian-born, Chabad hasidic American artist. He was the brother of the famed Mashpia Rabbi Menachem Mendel Futerfas. Lieberman was known in the Chabad community as Feter Hendel ("Uncle Hendel").

Biography
Hendel was born in Pleshchenitsy, Belarus (then part of the Russian Empire) as Chenoch Hendel Futerfas. In 1925 he married Breina Freidman, with whom he had two daughters. Breina and the two girls were killed by a Nazi Einsatzgruppe in 1941, in Brahin, Belarus, while Hendel was serving in the Red Army.

In 1946, Hendel left the USSR using forged Polish papers; afraid that the KGB would track him down, he changed his surname to Lieberman. After short stays in Paris and London, in 1951 he settled in Brooklyn, New York, where he became a devoted Hasid, follower of Rabbi Menachem Mendel Schneerson, the seventh Lubavitcher Rebbe.

Art
Hendel Lieberman's art is noted for its depiction of Jewish and Hasidic life and customs. His paintings hang in a number of museums including the New York Metropolitan Museum of Art, London's Tate Gallery, and museums in Paris.

Legacy
The Chabad rock band Feter Hendel ("Uncle Hendel") is named after Hendel Lieberman.

See also
 Michoel Muchnik
 Yitzchok Moully

References

External links
Article
Biography of Hendel Lieberman By Joshua Dubrovsky
An interview with Hendel Lieberman By Lubavitch Archives

1900 births
1976 deaths
American Hasidim
Chabad-Lubavitch Hasidim
Jews from the Russian Empire
Jewish American artists
Futerfas, Hendel
Soviet emigrants to the United States
Soviet Jews